Michael Joseph Pennington (born 5 September 1970), better known as Johnny Vegas, is an English comedian, actor, writer, and director. He is known for his thick Lancashire accent, husky voice, chunky appearance, angry comedic rants, and use of surreal humour.

Vegas' television roles have included Al in the ITV Digital and PG Tips adverts, Moz in the BBC Three dark comedy Ideal, Geoff Maltby ("The Oracle") in the ITV sitcom Benidorm, and Eric Agnew in the BBC One sitcom Still Open All Hours. He is also a frequent guest on panel shows such as QI and 8 Out of 10 Cats Does Countdown.

Early life
Vegas was born Michael Joseph Pennington on 5 September 1970, in the Thatto Heath area of St Helens, Lancashire. He has an older sister and two older brothers, alongside whom he was brought up as Catholic. At the age of 11, he attended the boarding school and seminary St Joseph's College in Up Holland to train for the priesthood, but came back homesick after four terms.

Whilst competing on Channel 4’s festive special The Greatest Snowman (2021), Vegas revealed that he had to play Santa Claus as his father was stuck at work. Vegas was only 13, so knew most of the kids.

As a teenager Vegas excelled at athletics and regularly represented Merseyside in national competitions in the 800 and 1500 metres. Vegas says his athletics career came to a sudden end,  aged 16, when McDonald's opened its first restaurant in St Helens. 

Vegas earned a BA in Art and Ceramics from Middlesex University in the Hendon area of London, then returned to his home town and took various odd jobs; he worked in an Argos warehouse, sold boiler insurance door-to-door, packed bottles of Cif in a factory, and was a barman at a local pub. Between 1994-97, he was a member of Cluub Zarathustra, a comedy performance group led by Stewart Lee, Roger Mann, and Simon Munnery.

Career

Television and radio
In 1996, Vegas made his television debut as a contestant on Win, Lose or Draw in the UK under his real name, but made references to the fact he wanted to be a comedian and that his stage name was "Johnny Vegas".
He featured on The Big Breakfast during the programme's final months before it ended in March 2002. His appearance was briefly shown during Channel 4's 100 Greatest Stand-Ups and BBC Three's Almost Famous 2. Vegas gained a wider audience as a regular member of Shooting Stars. His character was a pitiable sort always nursing a pint of Guinness. In 2001 he appeared on the Weakest Link, in a comedians special and beat Barry Cryer to win the jackpot of £10,200.

In 2002, Vegas starred in the BBC Radio 4 sitcom Night Class, which he co-wrote with Tony Burgess and Tony Pitts, with Dirk Maggs as director. Vegas played a former Butlin's redcoat teaching evening classes in pottery. It was a runner-up for best comedy at the Sony Radio Academy Awards.

He starred in the BBC Three sitcom Ideal as Moz from 2005 to 2011.

In 2005 he played Krook in the BBC adaptation of Dickens' Bleak House.

Between 2007 and 2009, Vegas played Geoff Maltby, aka "The Oracle", in the ITV sitcom Benidorm  and from 2015 to 2017.

In 2012, Vegas played the role of Mr. Croombe in a television adaptation of David Walliams' children's novel Mr Stink.

In 2014, Vegas voiced Fat Baz in the ITV4 animated sitcom Warren United.

In August 2014, Vegas took part in ITV's two-part documentary series Secrets from the Clink. In May 2013, Vegas played the role of Lord Ratspeaker in a BBC radio adaptation of Neil Gaiman's Neverwhere, adapted by Dirk Maggs.

Since 26 December 2013, Vegas has played Wet Eric Agnew in the revived BBC sitcom Still Open All Hours. Vegas has guest presented numerous episodes of Sunday Brunch for Channel 4.

In August 2015, he narrated the four-part series Travel Guides for ITV. In 2016, he took part in ITV's celebrity driving show Drive, hosted by Vernon Kay.

In August 2016, Vegas starred in a one-off comedy pilot called Home From Home, playing the lead role of Neil Hackett. Filmed at Skiddaw View Holiday Park, the episode aired on BBC Two on 30 August 2016. In December 2016 it was announced that Home From Home had been commissioned for a full series to air on BBC One in 2018.

Beginning in September 2019 Vegas has starred as the voice of the title character in the surreal children's animated series The Rubbish World of Dave Spud.

He is a regular panellist on the quiz show QI, having starred in 12 episodes as of 2019.

Johnny has appeared as a guest panellist and team captain on Channel 4's 8 Out of 10 Cats Does Countdown, appearing in 11 episodes. On 9 September 2017 he gained critical acclaim for his long poem about a drunk patron during last calls before bars closing.

Film
In 2003, Vegas played Jackie Symes in the film The Virgin of Liverpool, Alf Prince in the film Cheeky and Trevor in the film Blackball. In 2004, he played Dave in the film Sex Lives of the Potato Men and voiced Uncle Stewart in the film Terkel in Trouble. In 2013, Vegas was the voice of Abu the hamster in the British film The Harry Hill Movie.

Vegas provided the voice for Asbo in the 2018 Aardman Animations film Early Man.

Other projects
Vegas appeared in Joe Orton's The Erpingham Camp at the 2000 Edinburgh Festival. In 2001, Vegas starred as Al in adverts for ITV Digital with a puppet named Monkey (voiced by Ben Miller). In 2007, he reprised the role in adverts for PG Tips tea.

Having achieved fame in entertainment, Vegas received plaudits for his ceramic work. Ceramic Review praised him, leading to a role in Pot Shots (collaborating with Roger Law), a film made for an international gathering of potters. This led to his work being acquired for a collection at the Victoria and Albert Museum and a commission from Old Spice to design a bottle for their aftershave.

In 2014, he directed a music video for Paul Heaton and Jacqui Abbott. That year he also published his autobiography.

In May 2017, it was announced Vegas would be starring in new comedy feature Eaten by Lions opposite Antonio Aakeel and Jack Carroll, directed by Jason Wingard.

Personal life
In August 2002, Vegas married Catherine "Kitty" Donnelly; in a satire of celebrities selling exclusive pictures of their weddings to publications for high prices, he sold pictures of the ceremony to the adult comic Viz for £1. They separated in late-2006 and divorced in 2008. They have one child together.  In April 2011, he married Irish television presenter Maia Dunphy in Seville. In January 2015, they announced that they were expecting their first child together. They separated in late-2017, reconciled in November 2018, and separated again some time before April 2020.

Vegas continues to live in his home town of St Helens, and has been outspoken about the pride he takes in it; he is well-known for being active in supporting the local community. He fulfilled a lifetime ambition by appearing for St Helens RFC in Keiron Cunningham's testimonial rugby league game, a friendly against Hull FC, in 2005.

In December 2012, Vegas said that he had recently returned to the Roman Catholic faith in which his parents brought him up, and credited the faith for his good upbringing.

In July 2014, Vegas was awarded an honorary doctorate from Edge Hill University.

Vegas is a supporter of the Labour Party and has spoken about his appreciation for the NHS.

Filmography

Film

Television

Radio

References

External links

 
 Sitting pretty by Miranda Sawyer – The Guardian, 15 May 2005.

1970 births
Living people
20th-century English comedians
20th-century English male actors
21st-century English comedians
21st-century English male actors
Alter egos
Alumni of Middlesex University
Comedians from Lancashire
English male comedians
English male film actors
English male radio actors
English male television actors
English male voice actors
English Roman Catholics
English socialists
Male actors from Lancashire
St Helens R.F.C. players
People with attention deficit hyperactivity disorder